Holcomb is an unincorporated community and census-designated place (CDP) in Grenada County, Mississippi, United States. It is part of the Grenada Micropolitan Statistical Area. As of the 2010 census the community had a population of 600.

Holcomb has a post office with the ZIP Code of 38940.

History
The community was founded in 1901 on land that once was the home site of Choctaw Indian Chief Isaac Perry.

Holcomb is located on the former Illinois Central Railroad.

At one time, Holcomb was home to a stave factory, Munger System Gin, axe handle factory, church, saw mill, and several general stores. The Bank of Holcomb was established in 1905.

Geography
Holcomb is in western Grenada County, on the south side of the valley of the Yalobusha River. The two highways split in Holcomb, with Highway 7 leading southwest  to Greenwood and Highway 8 leading west  to Ruleville. Mississippi Highway 35 passes through Holcomb as well, leading south  to Carrollton and north  to Charleston.

Climate
The climate in this area is characterized by hot, humid summers and generally mild to cool winters.  According to the Köppen Climate Classification system, Holcomb has a humid subtropical climate, abbreviated "Cfa" on climate maps.

Demographics

Notable natives
 Kristi Addis, 1987 Miss Teen USA

References

External links 
Holcomb community website

Gallery

Census-designated places in Grenada County, Mississippi
Census-designated places in Mississippi
Populated places established in 1901
1901 establishments in Mississippi